The Koko Njekodi (Guugu-Nyiguudyi) were an indigenous Australian people of Northern Queensland.

Country
In Norman Tindale's calculations, the Kokonyekodi were assigned a territorial reach of some  around the area of the Starcke River, running northwest almost to Murdoch Point on the Coral Sea. Their southeastern limit was at Cape Flattery, and they were also present at Munburra.

Alternative names
 Koko-negodi
 Bindjiwara
 Beengeewarra
 Gugu-Almur (?)

Notes

Citations

Sources

Aboriginal peoples of Queensland